Monash Art, Design and Architecture (MADA), also known ad the  Faculty of Art, Design & Architecture at Monash University, undertakes teaching and research in the areas of fine art, design, architecture, urban design and curation. Created from the Monash University College of Art and Design and formerly known as the Faculty of Art and Design, it is located at the Caulfield Campus.

History
In 1993, John Redmond joined Monash University as Director of Monash University College of Art and Design, and was appointed founding Dean of the new Faculty of Art and Design in 1998.

In 2008, the Faculty launched a new course in architecture, the first new architecture course in Australia for 30 years, resulting in the faculty being renamed the Faculty of Art, Design and Architecture. Shane Murray was appointed as the foundation professor of architecture. Professor Murray became the dean of the Faculty of Art, Design & Architecture in 2011, and Dr Diego Ramirez-Lovering was appointed as head of architecture. In 2018, Professor Naomi Stead was appointed head of architecture, and Professor Carl Grodach was appointed founding professor of Urban Planning and Design.

Description
Monash is one of few institutions in Australia to offer a range of these disciplines within the one faculty.

The Faculty is located at Monash University's Caulfield Campus and incorporates:
 Department of Fine Art - Current Head of Fine Art is Dr Spiros Panigirakis
 Department of Design - Current Head of Design is Dr Gene Bawden
 Department of Architecture - Current Head of Architecture is Dr Mel Dodd

Also at the Caulfield campus is Monash University Museum of Art (MUMA) and the MADA Gallery.

References

External links 
 

Art schools in Australia
Art, Design and Architecture